State Route 255 (SR 255) is a state highway in the U.S. state of California. It is a loop route of U.S. Route 101 in Humboldt County that runs through the Samoa Peninsula on the western side of Humboldt Bay.

Route description

It is a western alternate route of U.S. Route 101 between Eureka and Arcata, routed via the three bridges over Humboldt Bay and Tuluwat Island and Woodley Islands, rather than motorists having to circumvent the entire northern section of the bay (known as Arcata Bay) to the road connecting the Arcata area to the Samoa Peninsula. In literature and locally, the portion of the road crossing Humboldt Bay (on three separate bridges) is known collectively as the "Samoa Bridge", the bridge is considered a freeway.

Highway 255 provides direct access to industrial operations on the Samoa Peninsula and the communities of Samoa, Fairhaven, and Manila, all of which are located on the Samoa Peninsula, with the entire combined area located within Greater Eureka.

SR 255 is part of the National Highway System, a network of highways that are considered essential to the country's economy, defense, and mobility by the Federal Highway Administration.

History
Before the Samoa Bridge (actually three spans) was completed in 1971, direct access to Samoa from Eureka was by boat or on a fleet of small ferries constructed on the bay or the original circuitous route. The original alternative was a relatively extensive route which took drivers north to Arcata and then around the bay to the northern peninsula before reaching the heavily industrialized area adjacent to Eureka. Completion of the Samoa Bridge and the creation and designation of Highway 255, completed a circle around Arcata Bay by connecting to the New Navy Base Road (a portion now designated as 255), along the peninsula connecting Samoa to the Eureka shore of the bay. This resulted in making the ferry system obsolete. However, one ferry, the Madaket, continues operating as a tour boat on Humboldt Bay.

Major intersections

See also

References

External links

California @ AARoads.com - State Route 255
Caltrans: Route 255 highway conditions
California Highways: SR 255

255
Eureka, California
State Route 255
Arcata, California